Agios Dimitrios is a village in Meteora municipality, Thessaly, Greece. It is located just to the northwest of Kalambaka town and the Meteora monastery complex.

Geography
Agios Dimitrios is a settlement located in a hilly area at the western foot of Antichasia Range. The village is surrounded by rocks that are an extension of the Meteora rock formation of Kalabaka. It is located near the east bank of the Mykani (Μύκανη) River and east of the  Servia-Elati provincial road (E-15), at an average altitude of 356 m. It is located about 38 km northwest of Trikala.

Demographics
As of the 2011 Greek census, Agios Dimitrios had a de facto population of 111 and a registered population of 102.

See also
Chasia
Antichasia

References

Populated places in Trikala (regional unit)